The Breslyn Apartments is an historic apartment complex which is located in the Spruce Hill neighborhood of Philadelphia, Pennsylvania. 

It was added to the National Register of Historic Places in 1982.

History and architectural features
Built in 1913, this complex consists of five three-story, brick and granite buildings with terra cotta and galvanized-iron trim, which were designed in the Beaux Arts-style. Each building measures thirty-eight feet wide and ninety-eight feet deep. The buildings features large open porch-balconies with Ionic order columns, segmental-arch windows, bow and bay windows, and terra cotta piers with Corinthian order caps.

It was added to the National Register of Historic Places in 1982.

References

Residential buildings on the National Register of Historic Places in Philadelphia
Beaux-Arts architecture in Pennsylvania
Residential buildings completed in 1913
Spruce Hill, Philadelphia
1913 establishments in Pennsylvania